Basingstoke is a roguelike and stealth video game developed and published by Puppy Games. It was released on Microsoft Windows, Linux, and macOS on 27 April 2018.

Gameplay 
The player must escape an invasion of deadly aliens on foot, using their "wits and cunning". The player is not able to use guns, only improvised gadgets. The ultimate objective is to escape the town of Basingstoke and get "as far away from it as you possibly can". However, the game does not have a health bar, and players die if they are hit once by the aliens.

Plot 
It is unclear if the game takes place in the same universe as Revenge of the Titans, but the game's name was based on the initial town where the aliens invaded in that game, where it was included "as a joke". When aliens suddenly invade the town, the player character is trapped and must figure out how to escape alive.

Development 
The director of Puppy Games, Caspian Prince, lived in Basingstoke for a year in 2008, leading to the idea to use the name in the games he created. The game includes some real locations from the actual town of Basingstoke.

The game uses the Unity engine, and was originally planned to be released in 2015. However, the scope of the game changed during development, leading to a significant 3-year delay and lengthening of the game itself.

Reception 
In 2017 Julian Benson of Kotaku UK called a demo version "a wonderful idea that looks excellently executed".

References 

2018 video games
Alien invasions in video games
Windows games
PlayStation 4 games
Xbox One games
2010s horror video games
Stealth video games
Roguelike video games
Video games developed in the United Kingdom
Video games with isometric graphics
Video games set in Hampshire
Basingstoke
Puppy Games games
Single-player video games